SKUP Award (SKUP-prisen) is a Norwegian journalism award.

It has been awarded annually since 1990  by the Norwegian Foundation for a Free and Investigative Press (Stiftelsen for en Kritisk og Undersøkende Presse) or SKUP.The award is a cube designed by Norwegian craftsman  and goldsmith Synnøve Korssjøen, along with prize money.

In 2015, winners were Anders Fjellberg, Tomm W. Christiansen, Hampus Lundgren and Anders Wiik from the newspaper  Dagbladet for "Wetsuit Mystery" (Våtdraktmysteriet). The investigative journalists  were responsible for the report about the connection between the discovery of two corpses in Norway and The Netherlands.

References

External links 
 SKUP - The Norwegian foundation for investigative journalism

Media
Journalism awards
Norwegian awards
Awards established in 1990